The creature is a 1977 drama film, directed by Eloy de la Iglesia. The plot follows a respectable bourgeois housewife who chooses the love for her black German Shepherd over her relationship with her husband.  La criatura is notable, like Walerian Borowczyk's La Bête (1975) and Nagisa Oshima's Max, Mon Amour (1986), for openly involving zoophilia, then a novelty in Spanish Cinema.

Shot in 1977, the film  employs bestiality as a symbol of Spain's political landscape.  It makes references to the massacre of Atocha and to  political right wing groups that after the death of Francisco Franco, tried to maintain the dictator’s political ideals.

Plot 
Marcos and Cristina are a well to do couple who had have been married for several years. Their relationship has been strained, in part because they have not been able to have children.  They are overjoyed when Cristina unexpectedly gets pregnant. Close to give birth, Cristina’s hopes are shattered when stopping at a gas station she is attacked by a black German Shepherd. The shock of the attack makes Cristina give birth prematurely to a stillborn son. To help his wife forget the tragedy, Marcos takes Cristina to the same sea side resort where they had spent their honeymoon.  Cristina recovers her strength and becomes attach to a stray dog that befriends her at the beach. The dog is also a black German Shepherd, the same breed as the one that caused her misfortune. Frightened at first, she soon began to pet the dog that proves to be charming, tame and very fond of her. Against her husband’s protestations, Cristina takes the dog back home to the city.

Marcos, a successful presenter of a TV variety show, is a conservative Catholic sympathetic to right wing politics. He remains faithful to his wife, dismissing the romantic advances of Vicky, the cohost of his TV program. While her husband is occupied at work, Cristina finds in her dog an outlet to the love she could not give to the child she lost. She calls her dog Bruno. The name she and her husband had previously chosen for their unborn son.

Marcos buys a new country house in the mountains for him and his wife. He is distraught by the increasing attention his wife gives to the dog. Cristina soon prefers the dog’s to her husband’s company. When Marcos tries to be intimate to his wife, the dog gets jealous and attacks him. Following Vicky's advise, Marcos buys a female dog, a White Shepherd. His strategy seems to work as Bruno begins to spend more time with his mate. However, Cristina dislikes the new dog. She is horrified when she finds the dogs mating. Shortly after, the female dog appears dead without explanation.

The relationship between Cristina and Bruno becomes even closer. One day Marcos arrives home finding his wife in bed with her wedding gown on the side spotting marks of Bruno's paws all over the dress implying that Cristina had had sex with the dog. Appalled, Marcos asks for advise to father Abelardo, the family's priest, who tells him to be firm and immediately give the dog away. The priest recommends a local teacher who lovingly takes care of the dog. Cristina is upset of being forced to give the dog away, but concedes.

Marcos makes an effort to rekindle the love in his marriage. He wants to try again to have children. However, he is distracted as he takes on a new political career in defense of his conservative views which he feels are threatened under the new democratic Spain. Cristina, who is as liberal as her husband is conservative, dislikes Marcos's political career. When Cristina refuses to have sex with her husband, Marco gets drunk and rapes her. Confronted by Marcos about her relationship with the dog, Cristina compares Spanish society to a hall of distorting mirrors. "I am surrounded by monsters. All I can do is become more monstrous than they are!" Cristina is tormented by nightmares. A phone call from her doctor awakes her telling her that she is pregnant. Resolute, Cristina packs her bags, leaves her husband, retrieves Bruno and goes to leave happily at the mountain house with her dog.

Cast
 Ana Belén  as Cristina
 Juan Diego as Marcos
 Claudia Gravi as Vicky
Bárbara Lys as the teacher
Manuel Pereiro  as father Anselmo
 Luis Ciges as Luis
Francisco Melgares as the Doctor

Notes

References 
Murray, Raymond. Images in the Dark: An Encyclopedia of Gay and Lesbian Film and Video Guide to the Cinema of Spain. TLA Publications, 1994,  
Smith, Paul Julian. Laws of Desire: Questions of Homosexuality in Spanish writing and film 1960- 1990). Oxford Hispanics University Press, 1992, 
Mira, Alberto. The A to Z of Spanish Cinema. Scarecrow Press, 2010.

External links 
 

1977 films
Films directed by Eloy de la Iglesia
1977 drama films
Spanish drama films
Zoophilia in culture